Diego Morais Pacheco (born 11 February 1983) is a Brazilian former professional footballer who played as a defender.

References

External links
 

Living people
1983 births
Association football defenders
Brazilian footballers
Bangu Atlético Clube players
Volta Redonda FC players
Villa Rio Esporte Clube players
FC Hansa Rostock players
Bundesliga players
2. Bundesliga players
Brazilian expatriate footballers
Brazilian expatriate sportspeople in Germany
Expatriate footballers in Germany
Footballers from Rio de Janeiro (city)